The 1999 K League Championship was the sixth competition of the K League Championship, and was held to decide the 17th champions of the K League. It was contested between the top four clubs of the regular season. The first round was played as a single match between third place and fourth place of the regular season. The winners of the first round advanced to the semi-final, and played against runners-up of the regular season over two legs. The winners of the regular season directly qualified for the best-of-three final.

Qualified teams

Bracket

First round

Semi-final

First leg

Second leg

Busan Daewoo Royals won 2–0 on aggregate.

Final

First leg

Second leg

Suwon Samsung Bluewings won the series 2–0.

Final table

See also
1999 K League

External links
News at K League 
Match report at K League 

K League Championship
K